A-1 Yola may refer to:
A-1 Yola (11/5 album)
A-1 Yola (Esham album)